Giulio De Stefano (born 6 May 1929) is a former Italian sailor.

Biography
De Stefano was born  in Castellammare di Stabia. He won the bronze medal in dragon class at the 1960 Summer Olympics.

References

External links
 

1929 births
Living people
Italian male sailors (sport)
Olympic bronze medalists for Italy
Olympic medalists in sailing
Olympic sailors of Italy
Sailors at the 1960 Summer Olympics – Dragon
Medalists at the 1960 Summer Olympics